Karim Bennani (2 January 1936 – 3 January 2023) was a Moroccan painter.

Biography
Bennani was born in Fez on 2 January 1936. He initially pursued commercial studies before leaving in 1951 to attend the Académie des arts de Fès. In 1954, he enrolled in the Beaux-Arts de Paris and also studied at the Académie Julian. In 1957, he exhibited his works at the Galerie du Bac in Paris and was invited to the Biennale d'Alexandrie. In 1967, he exhibited at the Galerie Charpentier in Paris.

Upon his return to Morocco, Bennani worked for the national tourist office and Royal Air Maroc. He was a founding member of the Association Marocaine des Arts Plastiques in 1972 and became its first president, serving until 2003.

Karim Bennani died on 3 January 2023, one day after his 87th birthday.

Works
Oil on canvas, untitled (1968)

References

1936 births
2023 deaths
Moroccan male painters
20th-century Moroccan painters
21st-century Moroccan painters
People from Fez, Morocco
20th-century male artists
21st-century male artists
Académie Julian alumni